In mathematics, a Generalized Clifford algebra (GCA) is a unital associative algebra that generalizes the Clifford algebra, and goes back to the work of Hermann Weyl, who  utilized and formalized  these clock-and-shift operators introduced by J. J. Sylvester (1882), and organized by  Cartan (1898)  and  Schwinger.

Clock and shift matrices find routine applications in numerous areas of mathematical physics, providing the cornerstone of quantum mechanical dynamics in finite-dimensional vector spaces. The concept of a spinor can further be linked to these algebras.

The term Generalized Clifford Algebras can also refer to associative algebras that are constructed using forms of higher degree instead of quadratic forms.

Definition and properties

Abstract definition 
The -dimensional generalized Clifford algebra is defined as an associative algebra over a field , generated by

and

.

Moreover, in any irreducible matrix representation, relevant for physical applications, it is required that

,    and gcd.  The field  is usually taken to be the complex numbers C.

More specific definition 
 
It follows that 

and

for all j,k,l = 1,...,n, and 

is the th root of 1.

There exist several definitions of a Generalized Clifford Algebra in the literature.

 Clifford algebra

Matrix representation 

The Clock and Shift matrices can be represented by  matrices in Schwinger's canonical notation as
 .

(Note that the matrices    are cyclic permutation matrices that perform a circular shift; they are not to be confused with upper and lower shift matrices which have ones only either above or below the diagonal, respectively).

Specific examples

Case 
In this case,  we have   =  −1, and

thus
 ,

which constitute the Pauli matrices.

Case 
In this case we have   = ,  and

and  may be determined accordingly.

See also 
Clifford algebra
Generalizations of Pauli matrices
DFT matrix
Circulant matrix

References

Further reading 
  
  (In The legacy of Alladi Ramakrishnan in the mathematical sciences (pp. 465–489). Springer, New York, NY.)
 
 
 

Algebras
Clifford algebras
Ring theory
Quadratic forms
Mathematical physics